Curt C. Bourque (born August 22, 1967 in Erath, Louisiana) is an American jockey in Thoroughbred horse racing. He began his riding career in 1984 at Evangeline Downs in Lafayette, Louisiana  and won his first race later that year at Jefferson Downs Racetrack.

During his career, Bourque has ridden six winners on a single card at Evangeline Downs. Riding in Chicago for the first time in 1992, he rode five winners on one racecard at Sportsman's Park Racetrack. He has won riding titles at Fair Grounds Race Course in New Orleans as well as at Chicago's Hawthorne Race Course and Sportsman's Park.

References
 Curt Bourque's 3,000th career win at barntowire.com
 Reprint of Chicago Sun-Times  February 23, 1992 article titled Bourque latest in Louisiana line

Year-end charts

1967 births
Living people
People from Erath, Louisiana
Cajun jockeys